Mangala Pinsiri Samaraweera (21 April 1956 – 24 August 2021; ,) was a Sri Lankan politician. He was the first openly gay politician from Sri Lanka. He was the Minister of Finance from 2017 to 2019, and the Minister of Foreign Affairs, for two terms from 2005 to 2007 and 2015 to 2017. He created a stir in Sri Lankan politics when he was sacked as a minister by President Mahinda Rajapakse in 2007, after which he formed a new political party called the Sri Lanka Freedom Party (Mahajana) Wing, which later merged with the United National Party in 2010.

Samaraweera served as a politician for over 30 years in his career until his retirement from politics in 2020. During his tenure as a politician, he was an advocate of liberalism and radical centrism opposing militarisation, as well as ethnic and religious polarisation. He also advocated for LGBT rights in Sri Lanka, despite Sri Lanka having not legalised LGBT rights.

Early life and education
Mangala Samaraweera was born on 21 April 1956 in Matara, Sri Lanka, the son of Mahanama Samaraweera and Khema Padmawathi Samaraweera née Amaraweera, his father was a cabinet Minister of Local Government, Housing, Communications, Posts and Telecommunications in Sirimavo Bandaranaike's government and his mother served as a member of the Matara Urban Council. Educated at Royal College, Colombo and at Waltham Forest College, London, he gained a BA in Clothing Design and Technology from St. Martin's School of Art in London, he served as a design consultant to the National Design Center of Sri Lanka and served as a visiting lecturer in the Institute of Aesthetic Studies, University of Kelaniya. It was veteran textile designer Chandra Thneuwera who invited him to join her at the Institute of Aesthetic Studies while he was working as a consultant for the Ministry of Textile Industries under the guidance of Wijayapala Mendis.

Political career
Samaraweera entered politics from the Sri Lanka Freedom Party as its chief organiser in Matara in 1983. He was introduced as Khema's boy when he was appointed as SLFP's chief organiser. He later became the SLFP party's Assistant Secretary and Coordinating Secretary of the Mother's Front. He also served as human rights campaigner in the 1980s during when Ranasinghe Premadasa was the President of Sri Lanka.

He first entered the Parliament of Sri Lanka as a representative of the Matara District in 1989, and he was appointed Minister of Post and Telecommunications in the cabinet of President Chandrika Bandaranaike Kumaratunga in 1994. He also served as the Minister of Urban Development, Construction and Public Utilities in the same Cabinet after a reshuffle and was later given the Deputy Minister of Finance portfolio.

Following the election defeat of his party in 2001, he was made the Chief Opposition Whip and the Treasurer of the Sri Lanka Freedom Party. In 2004 he became the Minister of Ports, Aviation and Media in the new cabinet of President Chandrika Bandaranaike Kumaratunga.

In June 2005, after conflicts with Kumaratunga, he dropped the Media Ministry, but remained Cabinet Minister of Ports and Aviation. He became the campaign manager for Presidential candidate and Prime Minister Mahinda Rajapakse. When Rajapakse won and took office in November 2005, he surprised many by appointing Samaraweera to the additional post of Foreign Minister instead of Prime Minister; Samaraweera maintained his other posts.

In late January 2007, Samaraweera was replaced as Foreign Minister, but remained as Minister of Ports and Aviation. On 9 February 2007, he was sacked from the cabinet together with ministers Anura Bandaranaike and Sripathi Sooriyarachchi after falling out with the then president Mahinda Rajapaksa. He then went on to create a new political party, the SLFP (Mahajana) wing. Mangala later became a vocal critic of Rajapaksa family and Rajapaksa government after being ousted by Mahinda Rajapaksa from his cabinet.

In October 2013, the Matara Magistrate's Court issued a Court order to arrest him and 10 others for their alleged involvement in obstructing a peaceful protest march in Matara by UNP activists, to oust its leader Ranil Wickramasinghe.

On 12 January 2015, Samaraweera was again appointed Minister of Foreign Affairs under newly elected President Maithripala Sirisena. During the 2015 Presidential election, he played a pivotal role as a joint spokesperson of the opposition coalition candidate Maithripala Sirisena.

After the 2019 Presidential election, Samaraweera joined the newly formed Samagi Jana Balawegaya which was launched in 2020 and led by opposition leader Sajith Premadasa. Mangala was reported to have played a major role in the break up of the United National Party and also led the formation of Samagi Jana Balavegaya. He resigned from the position of Finance minister as of 17 November 2019 only hours prior to release of the general election results.

In June 2020, he announced that he would not contest the 2020 parliamentary election which was held on 5 August 2020 and urged the public not to vote for his preferential number and revealed that it would be impossible to remove his name from the nomination list. On 9 June 2020, he also announced that he would step back and quit parliamentary politics.

Controversies 
In 2019, while being the finance minister he was accused of spreading hate speech about Buddhism due to his opposition to 
Sinhalese Buddhist nationalism  and monks urged immediate action against him for his comments about Buddhism.

He also criticised Cardinal Malcolm Ranjith in 2018 for Ranjith's comments on human rights and, in 2019, blamed Ranjith for visiting a Buddhist monk who was fasting.

He was accused of using Sri Lanka Transport Board buses to transport and locate voters for the 2019 Presidential election during his tenure as finance minister.

Personal life
He was openly homosexual. In November 2018, after homophobic comments made by President Maithripala Sirisena, he wrote on Twitter that “I would rather be a butterfly than a leech Mr. President!!!”

In May 2021, he featured in a YouTube video, "Light Upali", where he played the role of a warrior defending social media platform TikTok.

Death 
He died on 24 August 2021 at the age of 65 due to COVID-19. Prior to his death, he was admitted into the intensive care unit of the Lanka Hospital in Colombo after being tested positive for COVID-19 in August 2021. He was diagnosed with COVID-19 despite being fully vaccinated with both doses. Before his death was officially confirmed on 24 August 2021, rumours of his death started circulating on social media from 18 August. He was the second high-profile Sri Lankan politician to succumb to COVID-19 after W. J. M. Lokubandara.

Further reading

See also
List of foreign ministers in 2017
List of political families in Sri Lanka
List of the first LGBT holders of political offices

References

External links
 Mangala Samaraweera's Official Website
   Mangala for democratic leadership in SLFP
UNESCO Executive Board
Parliament profile
Interview with Mangala Samaraveera. The Hindu.

|-

1956 births
2021 deaths
Finance ministers of Sri Lanka
Foreign ministers of Sri Lanka
Sri Lankan Theravada Buddhists
Alumni of Royal College, Colombo
Members of the 9th Parliament of Sri Lanka
Members of the 10th Parliament of Sri Lanka
Members of the 11th Parliament of Sri Lanka
Members of the 12th Parliament of Sri Lanka
Members of the 13th Parliament of Sri Lanka
Members of the 14th Parliament of Sri Lanka
Members of the 15th Parliament of Sri Lanka
Sinhalese politicians
Alumni of Saint Martin's School of Art
People from Matara, Sri Lanka
Housing ministers of Sri Lanka
Posts ministers of Sri Lanka
Telecommunication ministers of Sri Lanka
Sri Lankan LGBT politicians
Gay politicians
LGBT legislators
Deaths from the COVID-19 pandemic in Sri Lanka